Krishnarao Pant Pratinidhi (also known as Krishnaji Parshuram) was a 17th-century Maratha general and Pratinidhi of Tarabai in Kolhapur, India. Born in a Deshastha Brahmin family, in 1713 Shahu I awarded the Vishalgad jagir to Parashuram Trimbak. Parashuram Trimbak sent his son Krishna to assume the management of fort and the jagir, but he no sooner obtained possession than he revolted tendered his services to Sambhaji II. He was appointed as Pratinidhi by Raja of Kolhapur Sambhaji II. Soon after the revolt Krishnaji established Vishalgad jagir in 1716. Krishnarao Pant Pratinidhi was the first Chief of Vishalgad.

References

17th-century Indian people
People of the Maratha Empire
1684 births
Year of death unknown